Levin Down is a  biological Site of Special Scientific Interest south of Midhurst in West Sussex. It is managed by the Sussex Wildlife Trust.

This is an area of chalk grassland and heath on the slope of the South Downs. The chalk turf has a rich variety of flora, such as autumn gentian, salad burnet, round-headed rampion, autumn lady’s tresses, eyebright, glaucous sedge and quaking grass.

There is access by a footpath from Charlton.

References

Sites of Special Scientific Interest in West Sussex